Jacques-Henri Sablet (1749–1803) was a French painter, part of a family of artists of Swiss origin.

Sablet was born in Lausanne. He studied with his father, the painter and picture dealer Jacob Sablet (1720–1798), before moving to Paris in 1772. There, he and his older brother Jean-François Sablet (1745–1819) studied at the Académie royale de peinture et de sculpture as pupils of Joseph-Marie Vien. Jean-François studied at the Académie in 1768–1773 and Jacques-Henri in 1772–1775. Although their careers did not follow a similar course, the attribution of their works has frequently been confused.

When in 1775 Vien was named director of the French Academy in Rome, Sablet accompanied him there. In rome he painted Le premier pas de l'enfance (Primi passi, in Italian) (1789): today that painting belongs to Pedriali Collection (Collezione Pedriali), in the City Museum of Forlì (Italy).

His ambition was to be a history painter, but facing competition from Jacques-Louis David and Pierre Peyron, among others, and lacking solid academic training, he could win no commissions. Instead he turned to portraiture, genre painting, and landscape painting. Most of his genre scenes depicted the city's everyday life and customs of the Campagna.

Jacques-Henri Sablet shared a studio with history painter Hubert Drouais and was friends with Simon Denis. He fled to Florence in 1793 with the rise of anti-French sentiment in the Papal States, but perhaps because of the competition he would face there from Louis Gauffier he soon returned to Paris. He accompanied Lucien Bonaparte when the latter was named ambassador to Madrid in 1800, serving as an adviser on his art collection.

He died in Paris in 1803.

References

Philip Conisbee, Sarah Faunce, and Jeremy Strick. In the Light of Italy: Corot and Early Open-Air Painting.  New Haven; Yale University Press, 1996.
Jacques Sablet on Artnet
 

18th-century Swiss painters
18th-century Swiss male artists
Swiss male painters
19th-century Swiss painters
People from Lausanne
1749 births
1803 deaths
Campagna Romana
19th-century Swiss male artists